Combustication is the fifth major album by experimental jazz fusion trio Medeski Martin & Wood, released on August 11, 1998. Combustication was MMW's first album for the renowned jazz label Blue Note Records, and also marked a stylistic shift for the band, with a deeper groove and the notable infusion of rhythmic influences from hip hop and a variety of other styles. The album is also the first to include an accompanying turntablist, in this case longtime MMW collaborator DJ Logic. Combustication features unique instrumental renditions of the Sly and the Family Stone hit "Everyday People," as well as the Hawaiian traditional "No Ke Ano Ahiahi." All tracks on the album have been frequently performed live by the band, often with tremendous improvisational variation.

Track listing
All music by Medeski Martin & Wood except where noted.

"Sugar Craft" – 3:22
"Just Like I Pictured It" – 3:27
"Start·Stop" – 6:39
"Nocturne" – 4:02
"Hey-Hee-Hi-Ho" – 3:15
"Whatever Happened to Gus" (MMW, Cannon) – 4:26
"Latin Shuffle" – 9:05
"Everyday People" (Stewart) – 5:27
"Coconut Boogaloo" – 3:57
"Church of Logic" (MMW, Kibler) – 6:38
"No Ke Ano Ahiahi" (traditional) – 4:48
"Hypnotized" – 13:37
 Includes a hidden song, "Combustication" (which begins at 7:37, after two minutes of silence).

Performers
John Medeski – keyboards
Billy Martin – drums, percussion
Chris Wood – basses, bass drum
DJ Logic – turntables on tracks 1, 3, 10
Steve Cannon – spoken word on track 6

Credits
Mixed at Greene Street Recording Studios
Assisted at The Magic Shop by Juan Garcia
Assisted at Greene Street by Danny Madorksy, Katsuhiko Naito, and Dennis
Mastered by Greg Calbi at Masterdisk
Band photos: Jimmy Katz
Design: Bleu Valdimer, Project Dragon

References

1998 albums
Blue Note Records albums
Post-bop albums
Medeski Martin & Wood albums